Dobunnodon its an extinct genus of docodont from the Middle Jurassic (Bathonian) Forest Marble Formation of England, first discovered in Oxfordshire near the village of Kirtlington. The type species, D. mussettae, was originally named as a species of Borealestes in 2003.


History
In 2003, Borealestes mussettae (originally 'B. mussetti') was named by Denise Sigogneau-Russell, based on isolated molars found in the Bathonian aged Kirtlington Mammal bed of Oxfordshire, England. It differs from B. serendipitus in the details of cusps and ridges on the molar teeth. The species name mussetti was in honour of Dr Frances Mussett, in recognition of her major participation in fossil excavation at Kirtlington Cement Quarry. However, mussetti is the masculine form, and so this has been amended to mussettae by subsequent authors, starting with Alexander Averianov in 2004. It was moved to the new genus Dobunnodon in 2021.

Appearance
Dobunnodon is currently only known from isolated molars. Docodonts are small (shrew to rat sized) mammaliaforms. Dobunnodon is believed to be a basal member of Docodonta.

References 

Docodonts
Prehistoric cynodont genera
Bathonian life
Jurassic synapsids
Jurassic England
Fossils of England
Fossil taxa described in 2021